Bourne High School is a public high school located in Bourne, Massachusetts.

History

Bourne High School is located about 1 mile west of the famous Bourne Bridge and "Cape Cod" topiary at the Bourne Bridge rotary that welcomes people crossing the Cape Cod Canal. Bourne High School's mascot is the Canalman and the school colors are Purple and White.

Demographics

Sports

Bourne is known for its strong boys' hockey teams which have won and participated in multiple state championship games. They play their home games at the John Gallo Arena, which hosts many of the state's post-season high school hockey games.

Hockey Accomplishments
State Champions - 2004
State Finalists - 1990, 2003
EMass Regional Champions - 1990, 2003, 2004

Also notable is the girls' Volleyball team, who won state championships in 2000, 2004, and 2018.

The football team went undefeated in the regular season in 1965, 1980, 2004, and 2011. In 2011, they won the Division 3A State Championship for the first time in the school's history and had the teams only perfect season.

Bourne high school also offers programs such as Football, Field Hockey, Cross Country, Soccer, Basketball, Winter track, Lacrosse, Spring Track, Softball, and Baseball.

References

External links

Schools in Barnstable County, Massachusetts
Bourne, Massachusetts
Public high schools in Massachusetts
1951 establishments in Massachusetts